Nomophila moluccana is a moth in the family Crambidae. It was described by Arnold Pagenstecher in 1884. It is found in Indonesia (Ambon Island).

References

Moths of Indonesia
Crambidae
Moths described in 1884